Michel Laurencin (20 October 1944 – 8 January 2023) was a French academic and historian who specialized in the history of Touraine.

Biography

Laurencin died on 8 January 2023, at the age of 78.

Publications
"L'aqueduc gallo-romain de Luynes et l'antique cité de Malliacum (Indre-et-Loire)" (1967)
La vie quotidienne en Touraine au temps de Balzac (1981)
Dictionnaire biographique de Touraine (1990)
"Le couvent de Jésus-Maria et les Minimes du Plessis-lès-Tours depuis la fin du XVe siècle" (1995)
En Touraine à l'aube du XXe siècle : un enfant du Véron, Gilbert Plouzeau (1900-1975) (2002)
Le Lycée Descartes. Histoire d'un établissement d'enseignement à Tours, 1807-2007 : édition du bicentenaire

Distinctions
Knight of the Legion of Honour
Knight of the Ordre national du Mérite
Officer of the Ordre des Palmes académiques
 (1981)

References

1944 births
2023 deaths
French academics
French historians
20th-century French historians
Academic staff of Cairo University
People from Indre-et-Loire
Chevaliers of the Légion d'honneur
Knights of the Ordre national du Mérite
Officiers of the Ordre des Palmes Académiques